Kim Soon-ok (born May 25, 1971) is a South Korean television screenwriter. Kim is best known for writing the television dramas Temptation of Wife (2008-2009), Jang Bo-ri is Here! (2014), My Daughter, Geum Sa-wol (2015-16), and The Penthouse: War in Life (2020-21), all of which are criticized for their provocative themes but are currently the highest-rated dramas ever aired in their respective time slots.

Filmography

As writer

As creator 
 First Lady (tvN, 2023)

Awards
2014 MBC Drama Awards: Writer of the Year (Jang Bo-ri is Here!)
2021 SBS Drama Awards: Lifetime Achievement Award (The Penthouse: War in Life)

References

External links
 
 

1971 births
Living people
South Korean screenwriters
South Korean television writers
Ewha Womans University alumni